"The Great Beyond" is a song by American rock band R.E.M., written for the 1999 film Man on the Moon. It was released as a single the same year for support of the film's soundtrack album. On the soundtrack, there is some dialogue from the movie at the end of the track; meanwhile, the single version is a radio edit, with the bridge omitted.

"The Great Beyond" reached number three on the UK Singles Chart in January 2000, the band's highest-ever chart position in that country, and it was nominated for a Grammy Award for Best Song Written for a Motion Picture, Television or Other Visual Media. It additionally became a top-20 hit in Canada, Iceland, Ireland, Italy, and Norway. The unedited version is included in two R.E.M. compilations: In Time - The Best of R.E.M. 1988-2003 and Part Lies, Part Heart, Part Truth, Part Garbage 1982–2011.

Background and content
According to the book Perfect Circle: The Story of R.E.M., the band employed their then-usual live musicians when recording the song: "To record the single, the group convened at John Keane's. Joey Waronker was brought in on drums; Scott McCaughey and Ken Stringfellow were each invited to take part; Pat McCarthy returned to the producer's chair."

In the unedited version, at 4:09 and at 4:26, the listener can hear Michael Stipe singing the following lines in the background: "Here's a little agit for the never-believer, here's a little ghost for the offering". Both lines were taken from the band's 1992 song "Man on the Moon", also about Andy Kaufman, from which the film took its title.

Music video
The song's video was directed by Liz Friedlander. It originally featured footage of Jim Carrey as Andy Kaufman from the 1999 film. Yet, the compilation DVD In View: The Best of R.E.M. 1988-2003 (which accompanied In Time and collected R.E.M.'s major videos from 1988 to 2003), the video was remixed to feature archived footage of Kaufman himself (similar to the video for "Man on the Moon"). The original version can be seen on the Man on the Moon DVD. Carrey revealed in the 2017 documentary Jim & Andy: The Great Beyond that he had been invited to appear in the video in person, but refused, as he wished to psychologically distance himself from the Kaufman character; he stated that he now regretted the decision.

Track listings
All songs were written by Bill Berry, Peter Buck, Mike Mills, and Michael Stipe, except for "The Great Beyond", written by Buck, Mills, and Stipe.

 US CD, 7-inch, and cassette single
 UK cassette single
 "The Great Beyond" (edit)
 "Man on the Moon" (live at Glastonbury)

 US maxi-CD single
 "The Great Beyond" (edit)
 "The One I Love" (live at Glastonbury)
 "Everybody Hurts" (live at Glastonbury)
 "Man on the Moon" (live at Glastonbury)

 UK and European CD single
 "The Great Beyond" (radio edit) – 4:13
 "Everybody Hurts" (live from Glastonbury) – 6:21
 "The One I Love" (live from Glastonbury) – 3:10

Charts

Weekly charts

Year-end charts

Release history

Other versions
In June 2003, Michael Stipe sang an a cappella excerpt from the song for a BBC Radio 2 advertisement. He performed it on a stage in an empty theater. Welsh progressive breakbeat producers Hybrid later would use this a cappella to create a bootleg remix. A live version of this song is included on R.E.M. Live. The song was covered by The Fray in 2007 for the compilation album Radio 1: Established 1967.

References

External links
 Song lyrics at R.E.M.hq

1999 singles
1999 songs
Music videos directed by Liz Friedlander
Number-one singles in Scotland
R.E.M. songs
Song recordings produced by Pat McCarthy (record producer)
Song recordings produced by Peter Buck
Song recordings produced by Michael Stipe
Song recordings produced by Mike Mills
Songs based on actual events
Songs written by Michael Stipe
Songs written by Mike Mills
Songs written by Peter Buck
Songs written for films
Warner Records singles